B. R. Meenakshi (born September 20, 1979) is an Indian badminton player.

Career 
B. R. Meenakshi won in 1997 and 1998 four medals at the Indian Individual Junior Championships. In 1999 she finished second and third in the Indian Open. In 2004, she won her only national title among the adults and was third at the Indian Open. In 2006, she once again won two silver medals at the South Asian Games.

Achievements

South Asian Games

IBF International

References

External links
 

1979 births
Living people
Indian female badminton players
Place of birth missing (living people)
South Asian Games gold medalists for India
South Asian Games silver medalists for India
South Asian Games medalists in badminton
20th-century Indian women
21st-century Indian women